XHGR-FM is a radio station on 104.1 FM in Xalapa, Veracruz. It is owned by Avanradio and operated by Quatro Media Telecomunicaciones and carries the Los 40 pop format from Radiópolis.

History
XEGR-AM 1160 received its concession on December 21, 1957. It was based in Coatepec and broadcast with 1,000 watts as a daytimer. By the late 1960s, XEGR had moved to 1040; power was raised to 2,500 watts (with 1,000 watts night) in the 1990s.

XEGR was authorized to move to FM in November 2010. On April 1, 2019, it changed from "OK! FM" to Los 40.

References

Radio stations in Veracruz
Radio stations established in 1957
1957 establishments in Mexico